The 2008 PartyPoker.net European Championship was the inaugural edition of the Professional Darts Corporation tournament, which thereafter was promoted as the annual European Championship, matching top European players qualifying to play against the highest ranked players from the PDC Order of Merit.

Played from 30 October–2 November 2008 at the Südbahnhof in Frankfurt, Germany, the inaugural tournament featured a field of 32 players and £200,000 in prize money, with a £50,000 winner's purse going to Phil Taylor.

Format
First round — best of nine legs (by two legs)
Second round — best of seventeen legs (ditto)
Quarter-finals — best of seventeen legs (ditto)
Semi-finals — best of twenty-one legs (ditto)
Final — best of twenty-one legs (ditto)

Each game had to be won by two clear legs, except that a game went to a sudden death leg if a further six legs did not separate the players; for example, a first round match played out to 7-7 is then decided with one sudden death leg.

Prize money
A total of £200,000 was on offer to the players, divided based on the following performances:

Qualification
The top 16 players from the PDC Order of Merit after the 2008 Sky Poker World Grand Prix automatically qualified for the event. Then the top 8 non-qualified players from the 2008 Players Championship Order of Merit after the October German Darts Trophy in Dinslaken, Germany joined them to make a field of 24. 

The main European contingent then came from the following: the leading 4 non-qualified players from the 2008 Continental Europe Order of Merit following the October German Darts Trophy in Dinslaken, the top two non-qualified players from the German Darts Corporation rankings on October 25, and the last two places from a qualifier event held in Dinslaken on October 26 - an event which was open to any player with a full PDPA membership.

Draw and results

Scores after player's names are three-dart averages (total points scored divided by darts thrown and multiplied by 3)

All games had to be won by 2 clear legs, if after six more legs the players still couldn't be separated, a sudden death leg would take place to decide the winner. i.e. if Round One matches went 7-7, there would have been a decider.

Television coverage and sponsorship

The PDC announced on 12 August 2008 that ITV4 would broadcast the entire event live. This was the second PDC darts tournament that ITV4 has broadcast, after the inaugural Grand Slam of Darts - after its rating success ITV chose to broadcast this event as well as the 2008 Grand Slam of Darts.

The tournament was sponsored by PartyPoker.net, which has also sponsored other darts championships: the US Open, the Las Vegas Desert Classic and the German Darts Championship.

References

External links
Collated results of the 2008 European Championship

European Championship (darts)
European Championship Darts